Heaven's Door (also Doorway to Heaven) is a 2012 American spiritual drama film starring Dean Cain and Charisma Carpenter.

Story
Riley Taylor is a 12-year-old girl whose best friend, her grandfather, passes away. Her parents are also separated and going through a divorce, and her brother suffers from serious asthma. After having a near death experience that allowed her to pass through Heaven for one second, receives the ability to heal the sick and injured. After healing a neighbor's cat, she begins to accept money to user her powers, but her grandmother puts an end to this. She also uses her gift to heal her sick brother. It is discovered too late that whenever she heals someone she takes on that person's ailment herself. Knowing this, she continues to use her gift until she succumbs to her numerous ailments and dies. Through the power of prayer, her family wills her back to life.

Cast
Charisma Carpenter as Julie Taylor
Dean Cain as Leo Taylor
Joanna Cassidy as Ruth Christensen
Tommy 'Tiny' Lister as Ben Wilson
Edward Herrmann as Nate Christensen
Kirstin Dorn as Riley Taylor
Kaden Billin as Morgan Taylor
Mark Brocksmith as Delivery Van Driver
Annalaya Brown as Little Girl
Merrily Evans as Receptionist
Michael Flynn as Dr. Everett Sloan
Frank Gerrish as Wally Anderson
Anna Harris as Katie Davis
Grace Hunter as Toddler Riley
Jakob Hunter as Walter
Tom Markus as Bob Connelly
Mark Mattson as George Finley
David Nibley as Mitch Hillburn
Skyler James Sandak as Darley Allen
Jaci Twiss as Melissa Sue Davis
Connie Young as Nadine Dillon
Angella Joy as Reporter

References

External links 
 

2010s English-language films
2012 films
2012 drama films